Viviennea is a genus of moths in the family Erebidae. The genus was described by Watson in 1975.

Species
 Viviennea ardesiaca Rothschild, 1909
 Viviennea dolens H. Druce, 1904
 Viviennea euricosilvai Travassos & Travassos, 1954
 Viviennea flavicincta Herrich-Schäffer, 1855
 Viviennea griseonitens Rothschild, 1909
 Viviennea gyrata Schaus, 1920
 Viviennea moma Schaus, 1905
 Viviennea momyra Gaede, 1928
 Viviennea salma H. Druce, 1896
 Viviennea superba H. Druce, 1883
 Viviennea tegyra H. Druce, 1896
 Viviennea zonana Schaus, 1905

References

Moth genera
Phaegopterina